Double-Wolf is a 1991 novel by Australian novelist Brian Castro.

Plot summary
The novel is a fictionalised account of the life of Wolf-Man, Sigmund Freud's most famous patient, counter-pointed with an account of Artie Catacomb, a con-man and psychoanalyst living in the Blue Mountains of New South Wales.

Reviews
 The Canberra Times - Reviewer Peter Fuller considered the novel to be the best imaginative writing of the year

Awards and nominations
 1991 winner The Age Book of the Year Award — Imaginative Writing Prize 
 1992 winner Victorian Premier's Literary Awards — The Vance Palmer Prize for Fiction 
 1992 winner Diabetes Australia Prize for Innovative Writing and the Sheaffer Pen Prize 
 1992 shortlisted Miles Franklin Award

References 

1991 Australian novels